is a motocross racing video game developed and published by Nintendo. In Japan, it was released for the Famicom in 1984 and then ported to arcades as Vs. Excitebike for the Nintendo Vs. System later that year. In North America, it was initially released for arcades in 1985 and then as a launch game for the Nintendo Entertainment System later that year, becoming one of the best selling games on the console. It is the first game in the Excite series.

Designed and directed by Shigeru Miyamoto, the smooth side-scrolling game engine his team developed for Excitebike was later used to develop Super Mario Bros. (1985), which had the effect of Mario smoothly accelerating from a walk to a run, rather than move at a constant speed.

Excitebike was a critical and commercial success. It spawned several sequels and has been re-released multiple times onto other Nintendo platforms, such the Wii and Wii U Virtual Consoles, and Nintendo Switch Online.

Gameplay

Excitebike is a side-scrolling racing game in which the player takes control of a motocross racer. The two gameplay modes are Selection A as a solo race run, and Selection B against computer-controlled opponents. The objective of the game is to finish in third place or higher in a preliminary race to qualify for the Excitebike championship race. The A button accelerates the bike, and the B button activates a turbo boost that enhances the bike's speed, but overheats the engine if it is used for too long, forcing an immobile cooldown period. The engine's temperature can be reset by driving over arrows located along the course. The player can use the directional pad to shift between lanes, and to shift the racer's balance midair after a jump. Landing squarely on both wheels allows the racer to maintain momentum, but an uneven landing will result in a loss of speed or a crash. Design Mode allows players to create tracks using 19 types of hurdles, with options to save and load created tracks for the Famicom Data Recorder tape drive, which was unreleased outside Japan.

Other releases

Vs. Excitebike
There are two enhanced versions, both titled Vs. Excitebike.

The first version was released on VS. UniSystem for arcades in 1984, after the Famicom release. It is similar to its Famicom Disk System counterpart, though this version lacks the Design option, has three difficulty levels, and has other minor differences.

The second was released for the Famicom Disk System peripheral in 1988. The graphics and core gameplay are still the same, and the FDS version has several distinctive features that the NES and arcade versions lack:
 "Vs. Excite" mode puts two players competing against each other. The options include the maximum number of rounds to play, the track, and the number of laps.
 The music is completely different; none of the songs from the original game are present, and it has a gameplay theme. The music is composed by Soyo Oka.
 The "Original Excite" mode is based on the main mode of the arcade version, with minor differences such as a different color palette.
 Its writable disk format can save created tracks.

Excitebike: Bun Bun Mario Battle Stadium
 also known as Mario Excite Bike or BS Excitebike, is for the Japan-only Satellaview peripheral for Super Famicom. As a remake of Excitebike, the human racers have been replaced by Mario, Luigi, Princess Peach, Wario, Toad, and some of Bowser's Koopa Troopas. The concept was unchanged except for a "SUPER" mode where the player has unlimited turbo, and coins spread across the courses to increase top speed.

Re-releases
Excitebike was added to the European Wii Virtual Console on February 16, 2007, the same day its spiritual successor, Excite Truck, was released there. The game was later added to the North American Virtual Console on March 19. It was re-released in North America for the Wii U Virtual Console on April 26, 2013. 3D Classics: Excitebike was released on the Nintendo 3DS as a launch game for the Nintendo eShop in America, Japan and Europe; the game was initially offered for free for a period but then was sold at £5.40 / €6.00 for European markets and $5.99 in the US. It features 3D stereoscopic support and analog control support. This release was featured among other games from the Nintendo Entertainment System and Super NES to be released for the 3DS on a tech demo called Classic Games at E3 2010. It allows the player to save up to 32 custom created tracks that can be played in either 2D or 3D. It is one of 30 in the NES Classic Edition and Nintendo Classic Mini: Nintendo Entertainment System released by Nintendo on November 11, 2016. Excitebike was released on the Nintendo Switch in the Nintendo eShop on September 21, 2018, by Hamster Corporation as part of the Arcade Archives series.

Reception

In Japan, Game Machine listed VS. Excitebike on its January 15, 1985, issue as the fifth most-successful table arcade unit of the month. In North America, the game was number 13 on the RePlay arcade software charts in December 1985. It ended the year as America's second highest-grossing arcade system game of 1985, below Nintendo's Hogan's Alley.

The game has received generally positive reviews. Allgame gave Excitebike its highest possible rating of five stars. The review referred to the game as a "staple of any NES collection", praising its graphics as cute and its control as simple that still require strategy to apply properly. The review noted the design mode, as "the first of its kind in a console game, and greatly extends the life of the title by featuring 19 different components you can piece together to build your own course". IGN praised the NES version in 2007: "One of the original NES games, Excitebike was one hell of a ride 23 years ago  and it still is today." IGN praised it as "ridiculously addictive" and that it "proves video games don't need to have flashy graphics or complex AI to actually be fun. Sure, there are other racing games out there today, hundreds of them. This one may not necessarily be better than the recent stuff, but it's unique, addictive, and demonstrates what gaming is really about". IGN ranked Excitebike as the 14th best NES game. GamesRadar ranked it as the 12th best game on the NES Classic Edition, saying that it has aged well with "a great sense of speed while driving and an excellent sense of balance while jumping and landing". Game Informer ranked the game 44 on its top 100 games of all time.

Kotaku editor Jason Schreier ranked it as the worst game on the NES Classic Edition, calling it "a truly awful video game" but with no explanation.

Legacy
The side-scrolling gameplay of Excitebike was key to the development of Super Mario Bros. (1985). The same Miyamoto-led team that developed Excitebike went on to develop a 1985 NES port of side-scrolling beat 'em up arcade game Kung-Fu Master (1984) called Kung Fu. Miyamoto's team used the technical knowledge they had gained from working on both side-scrollers to further advance the platforming "athletic game" genre they had created with Donkey Kong (1981) and were key steps towards Miyamoto's vision of an expansive side-scrolling platformer. While working on Excitebike and Kung Fu, he devised the concept of a platformer in which the player can "strategize while scrolling sideways" over long distances, and has colorful backgrounds rather than black. Super Mario Bros. utilized the fast scrolling game engine Miyamoto's team had originally developed for Excitebike, which allowed Mario to smoothly accelerate from a walk to a run, rather than move at a constant speed like in earlier platformers.

Excitebike spawned several sequels, including Excitebike 64 (2000), Excite Truck (2006), Excitebots: Trick Racing (2009), and the WiiWare game Excitebike: World Rally (2009). An Excitebike-themed track is downloadable content in Mario Kart 8 and is available by default in Mario Kart 8 Deluxe. A group of Excitebike racers cameo as an Assist Trophy in Super Smash Bros. Brawl.

Notes

References

Bibliography

External links

1984 video games
Arcade video games
Famicom Disk System games
Game Boy Advance games
Mario racing games
Motorcycle video games
NEC PC-8801 games
Nintendo 3DS eShop games
Nintendo arcade games
Nintendo games
Nintendo franchises
Nintendo Entertainment System games
Nintendo Research & Development 1 games
Nintendo Switch Online games
Nintendo Switch games
Nintendo Vs. Series games
Off-road racing video games
PlayChoice-10 games
Racing video games
Sharp X1 games
Video games developed in Japan
Virtual Console games
Virtual Console games for Wii U
Multiplayer and single-player video games
Video games designed by Shigeru Miyamoto
Video games directed by Shigeru Miyamoto
Video games produced by Shigeru Miyamoto
Video games scored by Akito Nakatsuka
Video games scored by Soyo Oka
Video games with user-generated gameplay content
Hamster Corporation games